This is a list of all settlements in Antigua and Barbuda with over 700 people.

If the settlements name is in bold, the settlement is a capital of a parish. If the settlements is the largest city in a parish, it is in italics, if both, it is bold and italic.

List

References 

Antigua and Barbuda people